Connie Mak Kit-man (born 19 December 1954 in HK), also called Connie Mak and Kitman Mak, is a Hong Kong singer and actress. Her ancestral hometown is Qingyuan, Guangdong.

In 1977, she was the contestant of the Miss Hong Kong Pageant but did not win the title. She made albums for primarily Crown Records and Cinepoly Records. Some of her songs are heard in Cantonese-language series and films. In 1983, Mak recorded "Rhine River Romance", lyricised by Cheng Kwok-kong and composed by Joseph Koo. Hong Kong University professor, Stephen Chu, called the song a fairy tale feeling. In 1989, she sang "Years of Silence", written by Gene Lau and composed by Beyond band member Wong Ka Kui, before the rock band Beyond re-recorded it in a rockier style.

She is married to actor Kwong Wa since 19 December 1992, with a son and a daughter.

On 16 October 2019, she held a concert called 《BACK月黑風高旺角夜麥潔文MUSIC 2019》.

Discography 
Unless noted, the following albums are Cantonese. English translations are unofficial. Compilations that do not contain newly released songs are omitted.

HTA Records
 Not Investigating the Past  (tsin tsan mok zeoi gau), 1981

Crown Records
 Rhine River Romance ( loi yaan hoh tzi loon, 1983)
 Golden Date ( wong gam yeok wooi, 1984)
 The Young Wanderer ( Kong woo long tsi, 1984), as Connie Mak
 Five Lucky Stars ( ng fook sing, 1985), with Derek Wan, Michelle Pau Tsui-mee, Wong Yee-kar, and Susanne Ho Kar-lai
 Laiyinhe zhi lian / Jianghu langzi ( / , 1985), Mandarin, as Connie Mak
 The Grand Hong Kong ( dai heung gong, 1985), as Connie Mak

Cinepoly Records 
 Kitman Mak (1986)
 Dancing Queen, 1987, EP
 Come on Rock! (1988)
 Kitman Remix (1988), EP
 Bewildered ( mai lyun, 1988)
  New Songs and Hits (1989), compilation

World Record International
 Eternally Unforgotten ( baat sang naan mong, 1990)

Forward Music Hong Kong
 Presentation ( Tsing Hin, 2003)

References

External links 
 
 Connie Mak at VinylParadise.com (Chinese)

Living people
1950s births
Place of birth missing (living people)
20th-century Hong Kong women singers
Hong Kong film actresses
Cantopop singers
20th-century Hong Kong actresses